Jerome de Salis, Count de Salis-Soglio, DL, JP, FRS (14 February 1771 – 2 October 1836), Illustris et Magnificus, was an Anglo-Grison noble and Irish landowner.

Life
Jerome, Count de Salis-Soglio, was the eldest surviving son of Peter De Salis and his third wife, Ann, daughter of Bundespresident Antonio de Salis.

Born in Chiavenna on 14 February 1771, he died on 2 October 1836 at Dawley Lodge, Harlington, and lies buried in the ancient church of St Peter and St Paul, Harlington, London, which was at the time in Middlesex.

In a letter of 1830 he proposed spending the winter in Madeira whence:
'...should the Antichrist appear next year, I can easily get a passage to Chilli... by the dream I had in 1815, or rather a waking vision during an illness I had in Dublin, the application of aerial navigation to military operations will be a sign of the coming of the Antichrist.'

De Salis was a friend of Samuel Wix, the high-churchman, and paid for his Reflections concerning the expediency of a council of the Church of England and the Church of Rome being holden, with a view to accommodate religious differences (1818) to be translated into several languages.

Family
De Salis was married three times. His first marriage was to Sophia (1765 – 14 June 1803), daughter of Admiral Francis William Drake (1724–87), himself the brother of Sir Francis Henry Drake, 5th and last Baronet. The couple were married on 12 August 1797 at Shirburn Castle, and had:
 Peter John Fane de Salis, 5th Count de Salis-Soglio (St. Marylebone, February 1799 – 24 December 1870)

Four years after Sophia's death in 1803, De Salis married Penelope (died 20 December 1807), daughter of Dr. Robert Freeman, MD, of Uxbridge, on 14 March 1807 in Stoke Poges, and had one daughter. Penelope died shortly after her birth. A little over two years later, De Salis married Henrietta (Harriet) (9 October 1785 – 26 October 1856), daughter of Rt. Rev. William Foster, DD (1744–97). The couple had nine children, including Rodolphus Johannes Leslie Hibernicus de Salis, William Andreas Salicus Fane De Salis, Leopold Fane De Salis, and Henry de Salis.

Some events
 Appointed Deputy Lieutenant county Middlesex 9 April 1797.
 Commissioned as a lieutenant in the Loyal Uxbridge Volunteers (Corps of Yeomanry), 5 September 1803.
 In Armagh and Limerick settling Partition of estates with Lord Sandwich, September 1805 – February 1806.
 Elected a Fellow of the Royal Society, December 1808. His proposers were:
H J De Salis (his uncle);
Chas Abbot (1st Lord Colchester (1757–1829);
William Scott (Lord Stowell);
Joseph Planta I (1744–1827, aetat suae 84), a cousin and fellow Grison. See the monumental inscription to him in St George's, Bloomsbury);
George Pearson, MD (1751–1828);
Selsey, (John Peachey, 2nd Lord Selsey (1749–1816)); and
Edward Ash (c.1764–1829), MD, FCP. Physician Extraordinary to the King; editor of "The Speculator", Dublin, 1790; nephew of John Ash).
 Succeeds his father, 20 November 1807.
 Royal Licence to use title Count in the UK granted by George III, 4 April 1809.
 Appointed deputy-governor of county Armagh, 21 July 1809.
 He was appointed High Sheriff of Armagh in 1810.
 Rev. Dr. Henry Jerome de Salis, his uncle dies 2 May 1810.
 Patron of the new school at Mullavilly, Laurelvale, Ballylisk, Tandragee, county Armagh, 1811.
 Takes 21-year lease on Rokeby Hall, near Dunleer, from 29 April 1822, (550 pounds per annum).
 Royal Licence to use the name (& arms) of Fane before that of Salis, 1835.
 Ends his translation of all the extant works of St. Cyrillus of Jerusalem, 26 May 1835.
 Elected member of the Zoological Society of London, 1836 (probably).
 Recumbent figure made by Richard Cockle Lucas, for Harlington church, 1836.
 His house has five Carlton gardens, and it was sold with stables March 1845 for 12,600 pounds. The site is now occupied by BAE Systems.
 His widow lived at Dawley (near Hillingdon); the Continent; and after 1845 at Mivart's hotel and then its successor Claridge's.
 Recumbent figure made of his widow, Henrietta, by William Theed the Younger, for Harlington, 1856.

References and Notes

Quadrennial di Fano Saliceorum, volume one, by R. de Salis, London, 2003.
 NOTES OF PAST DAYS, By Cecil and Rachel De Salis, Henley-on-Thames, 1939. (Printed by Higgs & Co., Caxton Works).
 De Salis Family : English Branch, by Rachel Fane De Salis, Henley-on-Thames, 1934.
 Burke's Irish Family Records, ed. Hugh Montgomery-Massingberd, Burke's Peerage Ltd, London, 1976.
 A genealogical and heraldic History of the Colonial Gentry, by Sir (John) Bernard Burke, CB, LLD, vol. 2, London, 1895/1899 (pages 574–77).
 Burke's Peerage, Foreign Noblemen / Foreign Titles sections: 1851, 1936, 1956, etc.
 Debrett's Peerage, Foreign Titles section, 1920, etc.
 Der Grafliche Hauser, Band XI [volume 11], Genealogisches Handbuch Des Adels, C. A. Starke Verlag, Limburg an der Lahn, 1983 (pps 331–356).
 The Plantagenet Roll of the Blood Royal: Being a Complete Table of All the Descendants Now Living of Edward III, King of England, by Marquis of Ruvigny & Raineval, Melville Henry Massue Ruvigny et Raineval, London : T. C. & E. C. Jack, 1907, (re-published by Genealogical Publishing Com, 1994).
 Mullavilly – Portrait of an Ulster Parish, by Brett Hannam, Lulu, 2010.

Salis
Salis
Salis
High Sheriffs of Armagh
De Salis
De Salis
Jerome
Swiss-Italian people
Deputy Lieutenants of Middlesex
Counts de Salis-Soglio and Comtes de Salis-Seewis
19th-century Irish landowners
People from Harlington, London
18th-century Anglo-Irish people
19th-century Anglo-Irish people
Jerome
Jerome